Cinderella is a 1960 Soviet musical film directed by Rostislav Zakharov and Aleksandr Rou.

Plot 
The film is a screen version by Sergei Prokofiev's Cinderella ballet.

Cast 
 Raisa Struchkova as Cinderella
 Gennadi Ledyakh
 Elena Vanke
 Lesma Chadarayn
 Natalya Ryzhenko
 Aleksandr Pavlinov
 Yekaterina Maksimova
 Maryana Kolpakchi
 Yelena Ryabinkina
 Natalya Taborko

References

External links 
 

1960 films
1960s Russian-language films
Soviet musical films
Films based on Cinderella
1960 musical films